Ericodesma cuneata, the Corokia leafroller moth, is a species of moth in the family Tortricidae. It is endemic to New Zealand. This moth is classified as "At Risk, Naturally Uncommon" by the Department of Conservation.

Taxonomy 
This species was first described by Charles E. Clarke in 1926 using a specimen collected by him at Hope Arm, Lake Manapouri and named Tortrix cuneata. In 1971 John S. Dugdale assigned Tortrix cuneata to the genus Ericodesma. The holotype specimen is held at the Auckland War Memorial Museum.

Description 
Clarke described the species as follows:

Distribution 
This species is endemic to New Zealand. E. cuneata can be found at Taupo, Otago Lakes and Fiordland. The species, although rare, can be found frequently at The Wilderness in Southland.

Biology and behaviour 
The larvae of this species web leaves together on the foliated stems of its host plant.

Host species and habitat 

The larvae of E. cuneata feed on Corokia cotoneaster, (korokio). However the moth has not been associated with urban plantings of its host. The adult moth has been collected in beech forest habitat, as well as at strongly leached terraces and plains commonly called "wilderness".

Conservation Status 
This species has been classified as having the "At Risk, Naturally Uncommon" conservation status under the New Zealand Threat Classification System.

References

Moths described in 1926
Archipini
Moths of New Zealand
Endemic fauna of New Zealand
Endangered biota of New Zealand
Endemic moths of New Zealand